Edwin Stark Thomas (November 11, 1872 – January 21, 1952) was a United States district judge of the United States District Court for the District of Connecticut.

Education and career

Born on November 11, 1872, in Woodstock, Illinois, Thomas received a Bachelor of Laws in 1895 from Yale Law School. He entered private practice in New Haven, Connecticut from 1895 to 1912. He was a member of the Connecticut House of Representatives in 1899. He was Executive Secretary to Governor of Connecticut Simeon Eben Baldwin from 1911 to 1913.

Federal judicial service

Thomas was nominated by President Woodrow Wilson on October 16, 1913, to a seat on the United States District Court for the District of Connecticut vacated by Judge James Perry Platt. He was confirmed by the United States Senate on November 17, 1913, and received his commission the same day. His service terminated on April 12, 1939, due to his resignation.

Circumstances of his resignation

Thomas resigned during an investigation of his financial affairs by a federal grand jury, prompted by his connections to the bribery case of another federal judge, Martin Thomas Manton. It seemed likely that Thomas may have been offered a $10,000 bribe for a favorable ruling. He claimed to be suffering from nervous disorders which friends attributed to the circumstances under which he had been questioned by a federal grand jury. He resigned from the hospital.

Death

Thomas died on January 21, 1952, in Columbia, Connecticut.

References

Sources
 

1872 births
1952 deaths
Judges of the United States District Court for the District of Connecticut
United States district court judges appointed by Woodrow Wilson
20th-century American judges
People from Woodstock, Illinois